Jennifer S. Lerner is an American experimental social psychologist known for her research in emotion and decision theory. She is the first psychologist at the Harvard Kennedy School to receive tenure.  At Harvard, her titles include Professor of Public Policy and Management, Professor of Psychology (by courtesy appointment), Faculty Director in the Graduate Commons Program, co-founder of the Harvard Decision Science Laboratory and co-director of the Harvard Faculty Group on Emotion, Decision Making, and Health. Her research interests include the effects of accountability on judgment and choice. She founded and directs the Leadership Decision Making program within Harvard Kennedy School's executive education program.

Lerner was diagnosed with Systemic Lupus Erythematosus at the age of 16. She is an advocate for people with disabilities, especially children with chronic disease.

Education
Lerner received her B.A. in psychology from the University of Michigan Honors College in 1990. She received her M.A and Ph.D. in psychology from the University of California, Berkeley in 1994 and 1998, respectively. Her postdoctoral fellowship through a National Institutes of Health National Research Service Award (NRSA) took place at UCLA and focused on biological bases of emotion. From 1999 to 2007 she served on the faculty of the Department of Social and Decision Sciences at Carnegie Mellon University. Her primary PhD advisors were Dacher Keltner, Philip E. Tetlock and Shelley Taylor. She also received an Honorary M.A. Degree from Harvard University in 2007.

Work in psychology
Lerner's research focuses on the influence of specific emotions (e.g., happiness or anger), in contrast to most models, which focus on larger categories of emotions (e.g., positive moods or negative moods) on behavior and decision making. She has proposed a framework which predicts that the influence of a specific emotion on judgment depends on a variety of cognitive factors related to the source of each emotion. Currently she is working to test predictions from this framework. For example, in a series of studies, her research examines the distinct effects of fear, anger, and happiness on risk perception and risk preference.

Honors and awards

Radcliffe Institute Fellow, 2010–2011
Presidential Early Career Award for Scientists and Engineers (PECASE), awarded by the National Science Foundation and The President of the United States, 2004
Estella Loomis McCandless Endowed (Junior) Chair, Carnegie Mellon, 2004–2007
The National Science Foundation CAREER Award 2003-2008
National Research Service Award, The National Institute of Mental Health, 1998–1999
The National Science Foundation Graduate Fellowship, 1993–1996
Highest Honors in Psychology, University of Michigan, 1990
James B. Angell Scholar, University of Michigan, 1989–1990

References

External links
 Emotion and Decision Making Group
 Society for Judgment and Decision Making
 Jennifer Lerner's Faculty Profile
 Jennifer Lerner Interview, WWL Employment Summit

21st-century American psychologists
American women psychologists
Social psychologists
Radcliffe fellows
Harvard University faculty
Carnegie Mellon University faculty
University of Michigan College of Literature, Science, and the Arts alumni
University of California, Berkeley alumni
Year of birth missing (living people)
Living people